The hairy stone crab (Lomis hirta) is a crab-like crustacean that lives in the littoral zone of southern Australia from Bunbury, Western Australia, to the Bass Strait. It is the only species in its family.

Some controversy exists about the relationship between L. hirta and the other anomuran families. Candidates for its closest relatives have included hermit crabs, specifically king crabs, and Aegla. It is clear, however, that Lomis represents a separate case of carcinisation.

Notes

References

Anomura
Crustaceans of Australia
Crustaceans described in 1818